Guy Forget was the defending champion, but lost in the semifinals this year.

Boris Becker won the title, defeating Jim Courier 6–7(5–7), 2–6, 7–6(12–10), 7–6(7–5), 7–5 in the final.

Seeds

  Stefan Edberg (semifinals)
  Jim Courier (final)
  Boris Becker (champion)
  Ivan Lendl (quarterfinals)
  Guy Forget (semifinals)
  Petr Korda (first round)
  Karel Nováček (quarterfinals)
  Andre Agassi (second round)

Draw

Finals

Top half

Bottom half

References

 Main Draw

1992 ATP Tour
Donnay Indoor Championships